Barbil railway station, located in the Indian state of Odisha, serves Barbil in Kendujhar district.

History
The Rajkharsawan–Dongoaposi line was opened in 1924 and extended to Gua in 1925.

Rajkharsawan–Dangoaposi section was electrified in 1960–61. It was extended to Noamundi in 1965–66. The Padapahar–Deojhar and Noamundi–Barajamda sections were electrified in 1966–67, and the same year electrification was extended to Gua and Bolanikhadan. The branch line between Rajkharsawan and Dongoaposi was one of the first routes on the Indian Railways to be electrified with 25 KV-AC traction.

Iron ore
The area around Barbil has a number of private iron ore mines. The Barbil–Joda region is the highest iron ore-producing region in the country. The annual output is around 40 million tonnes of lump and fines. State-wise, Odisha is the largest producer of iron ore in the country. It is the basic raw material for sponge iron and steel producers, many of whom who do not have access to captive mines. Moreover, India exports nearly two-thirds of its iron ore production. Iron ore transport is a major task of the railway network in the region.

Trains
There is a Jan Shatabdi from Barbil to Howrah, an express train to Puri, a passenger train to Tatanagar and an inter-city express to Rourkela.

Running train list:

 18416/18415 Puri–Barbil–Puri intercity
 12022/12021 Barbil–Howrah Jan Shatabdi Express
 58109/58110 Tata–Gua Passenger
 18403/18404 Barbil–Rourkela Intercity Express

References

Railway stations in Kendujhar district
Chakradharpur railway division
Railway stations opened in 1925